Ketterer is a surname. Notable people with the surname include:

 Emil Ketterer (1883–1959), German track and field athlete
 Eugène Ketterer (1831–1870), French composer and pianist
 Franz Ketterer (1676–1749), German clockmaker
 Markus Ketterer (born 1967), Finnish ice hockey player
 Reinhard E. Ketterer (born 1948), German figure skater
 Sepp Ketterer (1899–1991), German Austrian cinematographer
 Theodor Ketterer (1815–1884), German clockmaker

German-language surnames